Peter Mancell (born 15 March 1958) is an Australian former cricketer. He played thirteen first-class matches for Tasmania between 1981 and 1983.

See also
 List of Tasmanian representative cricketers

References

External links
 

1958 births
Living people
Australian cricketers
Tasmania cricketers
People from Goulburn
Cricketers from New South Wales